Nitobe is the surname of a Japanese Samurai family and refers to:

 Nitobe Inazō
 Nitobe Bunka College, named after Inazō
 Nitobe Memorial Garden, named after Inazō
 Nitobe Jūjirō
 Nitobe Koretami
 Nitobe Tsutō

See also:

 Nitobeia